

M

References